Renzo Zanazzi (5 April 1924 – 28 January 2014) was an Italian racing cyclist. He won stage 10 of the 1946 Giro d'Italia.

References

External links
 

1924 births
2014 deaths
Italian male cyclists
Italian Giro d'Italia stage winners
Cyclists from the Province of Mantua
People from Gazzuolo
Tour de Suisse stage winners